Joan Carol Holly (1932–1982) was a science fiction author who wrote under the pseudonym J. Hunter Holly in the late 1950s until the mid-1970s. Holly lived and wrote in Lansing, Michigan and from her various book dedications, had a strong love of cats.

Holly graduated from Michigan State University during 1954 with a B.A. in psychology. Her affiliations at the University were Phi Kappa, Tau Sigma & Psi Chi. She was the recipient of the Hinman superior student scholarship.

Bibliography
Encounter (1959)
The Green Planet (1961)
The Dark Planet (1962)
The Flying Eyes (1962)
The Running Man (1963)
The Gray Aliens (1963, published in the UK as The Grey Aliens)
The Time Twisters (1964)
The Dark Enemy (1965)
The Mind Traders (1967)
Keeper (1976)
Death Dolls of Lyra (1977)
Shepherd (1977)

Holly also contributed to The Man from U.N.C.L.E. series of original novels, writing #10 The Assassination Affair.
 
Joan Holly also contributed stories for Roger Elwood's series of books and sci-fi magazines, under both her real name and her pseudonym. Some of these, The Chronicles of a Comer in particular, have a religious theme.

Sources

External links
 Joan Hunter Holly Papers (MS 252) at the Kenneth Spencer Research Library at the University of Kansas

20th-century American novelists
American science fiction writers
American women short story writers
American women novelists
Women science fiction and fantasy writers
1932 births
1982 deaths
20th-century American women writers
20th-century American short story writers